MCHP may refer to:
 Methyl hydroxychalcone, a type of chalcone
 Micro combined heat and power
 Microchip Technology NASDAQ code, an American manufacturer of microcontroller, memory and analog semiconductors